This article shows all participating team squads at the 1999 FIVB Women's World Cup, held from November 2 to November 16, 1999 in several cities in Japan.

Head Coach: Claudio Cuello

Head Coach: Bernardo Rezende

Head Coach: Chen Zhonghe

Head Coach: Ivica Jelić

Head Coach: Antonio Perdomo

Head Coach: Angelo Frigoni

Head Coach: Arie Selinger

Head Coach: Man-Bok Park

Head Coach: Nikolay Karpol

Head Coach: Kim Cheol-yong



Head Coach: Mick Haley

References
volleybox website

F
S